Bluff Cove ( or ) is a sea inlet and settlement on East Falkland, in the Falkland Islands, on its east coast. It was the site of secondary landings of the Falklands War of 1982, which resulted in a successful attack of the Argentine Air Force, which came to be known as the Bluff Cove Disaster.

It is near the Mount Pleasant highway overlooking a small harbour.

On the 8 June 1982, the 1st Welsh Guards were aboard RFA Sir Galahad also waiting to be landed at Bluff Cove when Sir Galahad and RFA Sir Tristram were attacked by Argentinian Skyhawk fighters who caught them by surprise. Both ships were badly hit.  The explosions and subsequent fires resulted in heavy casualties on board Sir Galahad. Forty-eight people, including thirty-two Welsh Guards, were killed or severely wounded, with many suffering terrible burns. The wreck of Sir Galahad was scuttled after the war, torpedoed by the submarine HMS Onyx. The hulk was declared a war grave. The disabled Sir Tristram was transferred to the United Kingdom where she underwent a major overhaul.

Climate
Tundra climates are characterized by sub-freezing mean annual temperatures, large annual temperature ranges, and moderately low precipitation.

References

Coves
Inlets of the Falkland Islands
Populated places on East Falkland